The Personal Data Protection Bill 2019 (PDP Bill 2019) was tabled in the Indian Parliament by the Ministry of Electronics and Information Technology on 11 December 2019. As of March 2020 the Bill is being analyzed by a Joint Parliamentary Committee (JPC) in consultation with experts and stakeholders. The JPC, which was set up in December 2019, is headed by BJP Member of Parliament (MP) Meenakshi Lekhi. While the JPC was tasked with a short deadline to finalize the draft law before the Budget Session of 2020, it has sought more time to study the Bill and consult stakeholders.

The Bill covers mechanisms for protection of personal data and proposes the setting up of a Data Protection Authority of India for the same. Some key provisions the 2019 Bill provides for which the 2018 draft Bill did not, such as that the central government can exempt any government agency from the Bill and the Right to Be Forgotten, have been included.

Background 
In July 2017, the Ministry of Electronics and Information Technology set up a committee to study issues related to data protection. The committee was chaired by retired Supreme Court judge Justice B. N. Srikrishna. The committee submitted the draft Personal Data Protection Bill, 2018 in July 2018. After further deliberations the Bill was approved by the cabinet ministry of India on 4 December 2019 as the Personal Data Protection Bill 2019 and tabled in the Lok Sabha on 11 December 2019.

Provisions 
The Bill aims to:

It provided for extensive provisions around collection of consent, assessment of datasets, data flows and transfers of personal data, including to third countries and other aspects around anonymized and non-personal data.

Criticism 
The revised 2019 Bill was criticized by Justice B. N. Srikrishna, the drafter of the original Bill, as having the ability to turn India into an “Orwellian State". In an interview with Economic Times, Srikrishna said that, "The government can at any time access private data or government agency data on grounds of sovereignty or public order. This has dangerous implications.”  This view is shared by a think tank in their comment number 3.

Fresh criticism on the international level comes from an advisor to a group proposing an alternative text. A moderately critical summary is available from an India scholar working with an American co-author.

The role of social media intermediaries is being regulated more tightly on several fronts. The Wikimedia Foundation is hoping that the PDP bill will prove the lesser evil compared with the Draft Information Technology [Intermediary Guidelines (Amendment) Rules] 2018.

Forbes India reports that "there are concerns that the Bill [...] gives the government blanket powers to access citizens' data."

Jaiveer Shergill, a prominent Supreme Court Lawyer has shared the pitfalls and gaps of the current version of the draft bill. There are serious loopholes of how the bill is unable to identify the scope of governmental bodies in distinguishing who has access to the personal data of the citizens and missing state bodies to monitor the personal data.

Withdrawal 
The Data Protection Bill was withdrawn from the Lok Sabha and the Parliament as reported in the Bulletin - Part 1 No. 189 dated August 3, 2022. The withdrawal of the Data Protection Bill come with reports that a more comprehensive version of the Bill may be introduced. Separately, instead of a Data Protection Bill, the Government may be contemplating introducing a Digital India Act, replacing the Information Technology Act, 2000, as reported by certain sources.

See also 
 Draft Information Technology (Intermediary Guidelines (Amendment) Rules) 2018
 UK Data Protection Act 2018
 EU General Data Protection Regulation
 UK Data Protection Act 1998
 Data security

Further reading 
Privacy on the Line: What do Indians think about privacy and data protection 
Data Protection Bill withdrawn: Roadblocks towards a comprehensive data protection framework

Notes

References

External links
 The draft of the 2018 bill
 Personal Data Protection Bill 2019 
 PDP Bill 2019: Impact on tech companies

Information privacy
Data laws of Asia
Data protection
Law of India
Computing legislation
Information technology in India
Censorship in India
Internet in India
2018 in India
2018 in law
Medical privacy legislation
Modi administration
Cyber Security in India